Point Pleasant High School may refer to one of several high schools in the United States:

Point Pleasant Borough High School in Point Pleasant, New Jersey
Point Pleasant High School (West Virginia) in Point Pleasant, West Virginia